Gro Schibsted Sandvik prof.em (born 2 October 1942 in Sarpsborg, Norway) has served as principal flute of the Bergen Philharmonic 1967-2004. She held the position from 1964 with Stavanger Symphony orchestra. Since 1967 she is a member of Bergen Woodwind Quintet, one of the worlds leading chamber music groups, performing to great acclaim the world over. The quintet has for 21 years been named Visiting Guest Artists in residence at the University of Minnesota.

Her exceptional versatility is evidence of an intense interest in communication through music at all levels. She has an active career as soloist and chamber music performer, which includes premier performances of numerous works written especially for her, and the Scandinavian premier of John Corigliano's Concerto for Flute, bringing 100 flute-playing children on stage!

Her philosophy of music and flute playing is derived from Mime and Acting Professor Emeritus Bud Beyer and her private studies with Marcel Moyse.

Career
Since 1965 Ms. Sandvik has been teaching at the Grieg Academy, University of Bergen and from 1999 she holds a professorship in music performance. Her articles on flute playing in wind bands are widely recognized and as a dedicated and inspiring pedagogue she is sought after as a guest lecturer and flute educator. She is involved in the project http://eogkultura.mkidn.gov.pl a collaboration on the presentation of Icelandic, Polish and Norwegian composers for young flautists. Her professional life has been described in the book by Ewa Murawaka : “Gro Sandvik, my life with the Flute”. She has been featured in Flute Talk Magazine Oct 2006 and was invited to teach and perform at the National Flute Association Convention in Albuquerque 2007. She has conducted Master Classes, given concerts and participated in the Pedagogic Panel at Honolulu University, Wichita State University, University of Minnesota, St. Olaf College, University of Wisconsin-Eau Clair, Concordia College, North Park College, Northwestern University, University of Northern Illinois, Ohio University, Peabody Conservatory, Wayne State University, Eastern Iowa Flute Association,  Northern Iowa Flute Association, Upper Midwest Flute Association, University of Belgium, Kuopio Conservatory, Royal Northern College of Music, Costa Rica Music Conservatory, Shepherd School of Music-Rice University, Paderewski Academy (Poznan, Polen), Iceland Academy of the Arts, Norwegian Academy of Music. 

Gro Sandvik is often engaged as adjudicator and has held positions on several committees pertaining to Norwegian musical education and performance. 2012 she had several weeks of teaching at Western Michigan University. For the Academic year 2006/07 she was Visiting Professor of Flute at The University of Iowa.

She has recorded extensively with the Bergen Woodwind Quintet and guitarist professor Stein-Erik Olsen . The music on the release “Chromos” with pianist professor Einar Røttingen, brings to the fore newly written works for flute and piano, and is proof that Norwegian contemporary music is nowhere near difficult to access.

She is an Honorary Member of the Norwegian Flute Society and the Bergen Chamber Music Society. November 2012 she was awarded the King´s Medal of Merit.

Discography (in selection)
With Stein-Erik Olsen

 1986 Double Delight, BD 7004
 1994 Diptych PSC 1083
 2010 Léspace entre nous, PSC 1268
 2015 Ketil Hvoslef: Seonveh, Double Concerto, PSC 1339

With The Bergen Wind Quintet

 1983 The Bergen Wind Quintet, BIS CD-291
 1989 Carl Nielsen – Wind chamber music, BIS CD-428
 1990 Pauline Hall (Suite for wind quintet) PSC 3105
 1993 The Bergen Wind Quintet, PSC-1094
 1998 Blue Dawn into white heat, INNOVA 517
 2000 Oystein Sevaag Early Works, Siddharta records / BMG 74321, 767262
 2001 The Adaskin Collection, AdLar Music MM 105
 2002 David Maslanka: The Bergen Wind Quintet, BIS CD-1228
 2008 J. Francaix: Quintets, Quartet, Divertissement, BIS-SACD-2008
 2009 Sunday sessions, MPR

With Einar Røttingen

 2007 Chromos, PPC 9059

Various

 1998 Speculum Regale, compositions by J. Blaauw, VEST-LYD 1998
 2010 Romanza, 2L-065-SACD
 2010 Gardens of Hokkaido, ACD 5072
 2010 New works for flute by Poznan-based composers, AP 0245
 2011 Flute Friends, AP 0204
 2013 K. Sivertsen: Dragning, Brevet til Louise, ARCD 1301
 2015 Ketil Hvoslef II: Octet LWC 1081
 2016 Ketil Hvoslef III: Sextet LWC 1117

A total of 153 works recorded with the Bergen Philharmonic Orchestra.

References

External links
Gro Schibsted Sandvik at the  University of Bergen
Bergen Woodwind Quintet

1942 births
Living people
Norwegian flautists
Norwegian classical musicians
Academic staff of the University of Bergen
Simax Classics artists
Women flautists